Jacobo Francisco Eduardo Fitz-James Stuart y Colón de Portugal, 3rd Duke of Berwick, 3rd Duke of Liria and Jérica, 9th Duke of Veragua, 9th Duke of la Vega (28 December 1718 – Valencia, 30 September 1785) was a Spanish Jacobite. On the death of his father, James Fitz-James Stuart, in 1738, he inherited his titles of Duke of Berwick and Duke of Liria and Xerica. (He also possessed many other titles in both Spain and England.) His mother was Spanish, and on her side he was a direct descendant of explorer Christopher Columbus.

Marriages and issue
On 26 July 1738, in Alba de Tormes, he married Maria Teresa de Silva y Alvarez de Toledo (6 May 1716 – 5 May 1790), daughter of Manuel Maria de Silva y Mendoza, (born 18 October 1677), 9th Conde de Galve, 7th son of the 5th Duke of Pastrana and Estremera and of the outstandingly wealthy Maria Teresa Alvarez de Toledo, (18 September 1691 – 1755),  11th Duquesa de Alba de Tormes, 8th  duquesa de Huéscar, 4th Duquesa de Montoro, 6th Duquesa de Olivares, 7th Duquesa de Galisteo, Grandee of Spain, and a number of lesser Spanish noble titles (such as Marquessats, Earldoms, Baronetages, Viscountships and Lordships).

Their only son to survive to adulthood was Carlos Bernardo Fitz-James Stuart y de Silva, (Liria, Valencia, 25 March 1752 – Madrid, 7 September 1787).

Titles
3rd Duke of Berwick
3rd Duke of Liria and Xérica, Grandee of Spain 1st Class
10th Duke of Veragua
10th Duke of la Vega
3rd Earl of Tinmouth
9th Count of Gelves
3rd Baron Bosworth

References
Profile of  James Fitz-James Stuart, 3rd Duke of Berwick, grandesp.org.uk; accessed 27 April 2016.

Spanish nobility
110
Jacobo
Dukes of Berwick
Grandees of Spain
Spanish people of Irish descent
1718 births
1785 deaths